Michael Ning  ( born 5 November 1979) known professionally as 
is a Hong Kong born Chinese actor best known for his role in the 2015 film Port of Call.

Filmography

References

External links

1979 births
Hong Kong male film actors
Living people
21st-century Hong Kong male actors